The Governor of Isle de France was an official who ruled Isle de France (now Republic of Mauritius) during the  French colonial period between 1721 and 1810. After the Dutch abandoned Mauritius, the island became a French colony in September 1715 when Guillaume Dufresne d'Arsel landed and took possession of it, naming the island Isle de France. The French government turned over the administration of Mauritius to the French East India Company, but the island remained bereft of Europeans until 1721. Furthermore, until 1735, Isle de France was administered from Île Bourbon, now known as Réunion.

List of governors (1721-1810)
A list of French governors and governors-general of the country from 1721 to 1810.

See also
 Governor of Mauritius

References

Mauritius
Lists of political office-holders in Mauritius
Isle de France (Mauritius)
Governors of Isle de France (Mauritius)